Adéyẹmọ is a Yoruba given name and surname meaning "the crown or royalty befits a child." People with this name include:

Given name
 Adeyemo Alakija (1884–1952), Nigerian lawyer, politician and businessman
 Adeyemo Fatai, Nigerian former table tennis player

Surname
 Adebowale A. Adeyemo, Nigerian physician-scientist and genetic epidemiologist 
 Adewale Wally Adeyemo (born 1981), Obama Foundation President and Biden nominee for Deputy Treasury Secretary
 Alhaji Abdul Azeez Kolawole Adeyemo (1941–2002), Nigerian Yoruba politician
 Ola Adeyemo (born 1995), Nigerian footballer 
 Olanike Adeyemo (born 1970), Nigerian professor of Veterinary Public Health and Preventive Medicine at University of Ibadan

See also 
 Adeyemi

References 

Yoruba-language surnames
Yoruba given names